Ajmer Singh (1 February 1940 – 26 January 2010) was an Indian sprinter who competed in the 1964 Summer Olympics, was a gold medalist at the 1966 Asian Games, in Bangkok, and later served as Director of Sports, Punjab University, Chandigarh.

Early life and education
He was born in a Jat Sikh farmer family of Kartar Singh Aulakh and Bachan Kaur Aulakh, at Kup Kalan village in the Sangrur district of Punjab

He graduated from Government College, Malerkotla, and later did his Bachelor of Physical Education (B.P.E.] from Lakshmibai National College of Physical Education, Gwalior. This was followed by M.A. from Punjab University, Chandigarh, and finally, he also did his Ph.D from Punjab University Chandigarh.

Ajmer Singh is the only Indian personality with a PhD degree in Physical Education to have been honored by Govt. of India with the Arjuna Award. He was a self-made man who came from very humble beginnings and remained a humble person all his life, an able administrator, a great coach and teacher, a passionate mentor, a strict disciplinarian, a warm human being whose heart and the home was always open to others, and a very fine family man.

Up to middle school level education, Ajmer had to walk to the neighbouring village of Rohira, some 2 miles (about 4 kilometers) from village Kup. Family being very poor, Ajmer walked bare feet, rain or shine, winters or summers, dressed in rags through thorny paths to school, and yet achieved first division at all school level examinations. There was no electricity in those days, and he would sit at night by a small oil lamp and study, as he would be out helping with all family chores at home and in the fields during daylight.

Always under-fed, and malnutritioned, Ajmer had knocking knees as a growing up child, and yet he became Asian champion in sprinting, and an Olympian athlete. Having lost his mother while he was a baby, Ajmer had only one regret having never known his mother.

Career
He took part in the 1964 Tokyo Olympics, two years later at the 1966 Asian Games held at Bangkok, he won a gold in 400 metres,  and a silver in 200 metres

Was on deputation as Special Education Officer to Federal Govt. of Nigeria from 1976 to 1979. While in Nigeria, Ajmer coached Daghba Minha who was his student at Federal Government Girls' College, Abuloma, Portharcourt, Nigeria, in athletics. Minha, under the able and dedicated guidance of Ajmer, became Nigeria's national champion in Shot Put and Discus Throw.

He also remained vice-chancellor of Laxmibai National Institute of Physical Education, Gwalior and Maulana Abul Kalam Chair and Director Sports, at the Punjab University, Chandigarh.

He died in Chandigarh in the morning of 26 January 2010, at the age of 70, and is survived by his wife, two sons and grand children.

He was awarded the second highest sports award, the Arjuna Award by Government of India in 1966

Two years before his death, Ajmer had declared his body be donated for medical research to Post Graduate Institute of Medical Education and Research at Chandigarh. Also, he Ajmer had declared that no memorials be made/constructed in his memory in any form. Both his wishes were fulfilled by his family.

References

External links
 

Indian male sprinters
1940 births
2010 deaths
Olympic athletes of India
Athletes (track and field) at the 1964 Summer Olympics
People from Sangrur
Athletes from Punjab, India
Asian Games gold medalists for India
Asian Games medalists in athletics (track and field)
Asian Games silver medalists for India
Recipients of the Arjuna Award
Academic staff of Panjab University
Indian Sikhs
Athletes (track and field) at the 1966 Asian Games
Athletes (track and field) at the 1970 Asian Games
Medalists at the 1966 Asian Games
Medalists at the 1970 Asian Games
Athletes (track and field) at the 1966 British Empire and Commonwealth Games
Panjab University alumni
Commonwealth Games competitors for India